Events in the year 2021 in the Democratic Republic of the Congo.

Incumbents
 President: Félix Tshisekedi 
 Prime Minister
Sylvestre Ilunga (until January 29)

Events
Ongoing – COVID-19 pandemic in the Democratic Republic of the Congo, Allied Democratic Forces insurgency (2021 Democratic Republic of the Congo attacks)

January and February
January 1 – Two soldiers and 14 Allied Democratic Forces (ADF) rebels are killed in fighting in Loselose village, Beni. Twenty-five civilians were killed on December 31, 2020.
January 4 – Allied Democratic Forces (ADF) kill 25 civilians in villages of Tingwe, Mwenda and Nzenga.
January 6
China extends debt relief. Congo’s exports to China, mostly in copper (Cu) and cobalt (Co), surged 30% in 2020 compared with 2019.
Two children and a woman drown when a boat carrying 100 passengers capsizes near Goma, North Kivu, in Lake Kivu.
January 8 – President Tshisekedi pardons and releases twenty-two men, including Colonel Eddy Kapend, convicted for the 2001 assassination of former president Laurent-Desire Kabila.
January 9 – Six rangers are killed by Mai-Mai fighters in Virunga National Park.
January 15
Forty-six African Pygmies, mostly women and children, are killed (some beheaded) by ADF fighters in Irumu Territory, Ituri Province. Two rebels are arrested.
The United States lifts sanctions on Israeli mining magnate Dan Gertler, who has been accused of corruption in the Congo.
January 17 – President Felix Tshisekedi pays tribute to Patrice Lumumba on the 60th anniversary of his assassination.
January 22 – The National Assembly files a motion of no-confidence in Prime Minister Sylvestre Ilunga Ilunkamba.
January 26 – Nine die and 19 are missing after a barge sinks on the Congo River in Tshopo.
January 29 – Prime Minister Sylvestre Ilunga resigns.
February 7 – A new case of ebola is reported in North Kivu.
February 15 – Jean-Michel Sama Lukonde becomes the new Prime Minister; 2021 Congo River disaster
February 22 – The Italian ambassador to the Democratic Republic of the Congo, Luca Attanasio, is killed in an apparent kidnapping attempt near Kanyamahoro, north of Goma. A carabiniere and their driver are also killed by the attackers. Their group was part of a larger World Food Programme convoy visiting a WFP-run school feeding program in Rutshuru. 
February 24 – Thirteen civilians are killed in Beni and Kisima. 1,010 civilians have been killed in fighting in Kiva since November 2019.

March and April
March 8
The International Criminal Court will provide $30 million to compensate victims of Bosco Ntaganda.
Julienne Lusenge, human rights activist, is awarded the International Women of Courage Award.
March 14 - At least twelve people were killed in a mass stabbing in Bulongo village, blamed on the Allied Democratic Forces.
April 12 - the new Lukonde cabinet is formed.

May and June
May 22 - 2021 Mount Nyiragongo eruption begins.
May 8 – Militia chief Jackson Muhukambuto is arrested in connection with 19 murders of rangers in Virunga National Park over a period of three years.

Scheduled events

April 3-5 — The foreign ministers of Egypt, Ethiopia, and Sudan will meet in Kinshasa for talks on the Grand Ethiopian Renaissance Dam.

Culture

Sports
January 27 – FIFA announces on that Constant Omari failed an integrity and eligibility check and is barred from seeking reelection.

Births
February 12 – Virunga National Park announces the birth of the first mountain gorilla, a male, of 2021.

Deaths
January 8 – Dorine Mokha, 31, dancer; malaria.
February 19 – Joseph Kesenge Wandangakongu, 92, Bishop of Roman Catholic Diocese of Molegbe (1968–1997).
February 22 – Luca Attanasio, 43, Italian diplomat, ambassador; assassinated
February 24 – N'Singa Udjuu, 86, politician, First State Commissioner of Zaire (1981–1982).
March 7 – Josky Kiambukuta, 72, singer (TPOK Jazz).
March 10 Henri-Thomas Lokondo, 65, politician, MP (since 2006); COVID-19.
March 21 – Honoré Ngbanda, 74, politician, minister of defense (1990–1997).

See also

COVID-19 pandemic in the Democratic Republic of the Congo
African Continental Free Trade Area
Sexual violence in the Democratic Republic of the Congo
Democratic Forces for the Liberation of Rwanda
Politics of the Democratic Republic of the Congo
International Conference on the Great Lakes Region

References

 
Democratic Republic of the Congo
Democratic Republic of the Congo
2020s in the Democratic Republic of the Congo
Years of the 21st century in the Democratic Republic of the Congo